René Besse (20 February 1891 in Toulon, Var – 13 February 1947) was a French politician.

Besse was Minister of Pensions for a few months in the second government of Albert Sarraut (1936) and Minister of Veterans and Pensioners from 18 September 1938 to 21 March 1940 in the third government of Édouard Daladier.

1891 births
1947 deaths
Politicians from Toulon
Independents of the Left politicians
French Ministers of Pensions
French Ministers of Veterans Affairs
Members of the 15th Chamber of Deputies of the French Third Republic
Members of the 16th Chamber of Deputies of the French Third Republic